Gasteracantha is a genus of orb-weaver spiders first named by Carl Jakob Sundevall in 1833. Species of the genus are known as  spiny-backed orb-weavers, spiny orb-weavers, or spiny spiders. The females of most species are brightly colored with six prominent spines on their broad, hardened, shell-like abdomens. Spiny-backed orb-weavers are sometimes colloquially called "crab spiders" because of their shape, but they are not closely related to the true crab spiders. Other colloquial names for certain species include thorn spider, star spider, kite spider, or jewel spider.

Members of the genus exhibit strong sexual dimorphism. Females are several times larger than males, which lack prominent spines or bright colors.

Gasteracantha species are distributed worldwide in tropical and subtropical climates. The genus is most diverse in tropical Asia, from India through Indonesia. One species, G. cancriformis, occurs in the Americas. Other genera in the same family are also known as spiny orb-weavers.

Orb-weavers' bites are generally harmless to humans.

Taxonomy and systematics
Gasteracantha has a complex taxonomic history, and many questions of species limits and distribution and generic interrelationships remain unanswered. Furthermore, challenges include the variability within individual Gasteracantha species (e.g., color polymorphism and variable length and shape of spines), a lack of male specimens and descriptions for many species, missing or damaged type specimens, and ambiguous initial descriptions in 18th- and 19th-century scientific literature. The 69 species currently recognized by World Spider Catalog include dozens of synonyms and subspecies, many based on literature well over 100 years old.

A 2019 study examining three mitochondrial and two nuclear genes found that Gasteracantha is paraphyletic with respect to Macracantha, Actinacantha, and Thelacantha. M. arcuata is allied with G. hasselti and A. globulata, while T. brevispina is closer to G. kuhli and G. diardi. The authors, however, did not propose generic reassignments based on their findings.

Micrathena orb-weavers in North and South America also have hardened abdomens with variously shaped spines, but they are not closely related to Gasteracantha within the orb-weaver family.

Species

, the genus Gasteracantha contains 69 species and 18 subspecies:

G. aciculata (Pocock, 1899) – Papua New Guinea (New Britain)
G. acutispina Dahl, 1914 – Indonesia (Sulawesi)
G. audouini Guérin, 1838 – Indonesia (Sumatra, Timor, Ambon), Philippines
G. aureola Mi & Peng, 2013 – China
G. beccarii Thorell, 1877 – Indonesia (Sulawesi)
G. biloba (Thorell, 1878) – Indonesia (Moluccas, Ambon)
G. cancriformis (Linnaeus, 1758) – North America, Central America, Caribbean, South America. Introduced to Hawaii
Gasteracantha c. gertschi Archer, 1941 – USA
G. clarki Emerit, 1974 – Seychelles
G. clavatrix (Walckenaer, 1841) – Indonesia (Lombok, Sulawesi, Mentawai Is.)
G. clavigera Giebel, 1863 – Thailand, Philippines, Indonesia (Sulawesi)
G. crucigera Bradley, 1877 – Malaysia, Indonesia (Java, Borneo), New Guinea
G. curvispina (Guérin, 1837) – West, Central Africa
G. curvistyla Dahl, 1914 – Indonesia (Togian Is.)
G. cuspidata C. L. Koch, 1837 – Malaysia, India (Nicobar Is.), Indonesia (Java)
G. dalyi Pocock, 1900 – India, Pakistan
G. diadesmia Thorell, 1887 – India to Philippines
G. diardi (Lucas, 1835) – China, Thailand, Malaysia, Borneo, Indonesia (Sunda Is.)
G. doriae Simon, 1877 – Thailand, Malaysia, Singapore, Indonesia (Sumatra, Borneo)
G. falcicornis Butler, 1873 – Africa
G. fasciata Guérin, 1838 – New Guinea, Guam
G. flava Nicolet, 1849 – Chile
G. fornicata (Fabricius, 1775) – Australia (Queensland)
G. frontata Blackwall, 1864 – India, Myanmar, Thailand, Indonesia (Flores, Borneo)
G. gambeyi Simon, 1877 – New Caledonia
G. geminata (Fabricius, 1798) – India, Sri Lanka
G. hecata (Walckenaer, 1841) – Philippines
G. interrupta Dahl, 1914 – Indonesia (Lombok, Sulawesi)
G. irradiata (Walckenaer, 1841) – Thailand to Philippines, Indonesia (Sulawesi)
G. janopol Barrion & Litsinger, 1995 – Philippines
G. kuhli C. L. Koch, 1837 – India to Japan, Philippines, Indonesia
G. lepelletieri (Guérin, 1825) – Indonesia (Sumatra) to Philippines, New Guinea
G. lunata Guérin, 1838 – Timor, Indonesia (Moluccas), New Caledonia
G. martensi Dahl, 1914 – Indonesia (Sumatra)
G. mediofusca (Doleschall, 1859) – Indonesia (Java), New Guinea
G. mengei Keyserling, 1864 – Malaysia, Indonesia (Sumatra, Borneo)
G. metallica (Pocock, 1898) – Solomon Is.
G. milvoides Butler, 1873 – Central, East, Southern Africa
G. notata Kulczyński, 1910 – Papua New Guinea (New Britain)
G. panisicca Butler, 1873 – Myanmar to Philippines, Indonesia (Java)
G. parangdiadesmia Barrion & Litsinger, 1995 – Philippines
G. pentagona (Walckenaer, 1841) – Papua New Guinea (New Ireland, New Britain, Bismarck Arch.)
G. picta (Thorell, 1892) – Singapore
G. quadrispinosa O. Pickard-Cambridge, 1879 – New Guinea, Australia (Queensland)
G. recurva Simon, 1877 – Philippines
G. regalis Butler, 1873 – Vanuatu
G. remifera Butler, 1873 – India, Sri Lanka
G. rhomboidea Guérin, 1838 – Mauritius
Gasteracantha r. comorensis Strand, 1916 – Comoros, Mayotte
Gasteracantha r. madagascariensis Vinson, 1863 – Madagascar
G. rubrospinis Guérin, 1838 – Indonesia (Lombok, Sulawesi, Moluccas), New Caledonia, Guam
G. rufithorax Simon, 1881 – Madagascar
G. sacerdotalis L. Koch, 1872 – New Guinea, Australia (Queensland), New Caledonia
G. sanguinea Dahl, 1914 – Philippines
G. sanguinolenta C. L. Koch, 1844 – Africa, Yemen (mainland, Socotra), Seychelles
Gasteracantha s. andrefanae Emerit, 1974 – Madagascar
Gasteracantha s. bigoti Emerit, 1974 – Madagascar
Gasteracantha s. emeriti Roberts, 1983 – Seychelles (Aldabra)
Gasteracantha s. insulicola Emerit, 1974 – Seychelles
Gasteracantha s. legendrei Emerit, 1974 – Europa Is.
Gasteracantha s. mangrovae Emerit, 1974 – Madagascar
G. sapperi Dahl, 1914 – New Guinea
G. sauteri Dahl, 1914 – China, Taiwan, Vietnam
G. scintillans Butler, 1873 – Solomon Is.
G. signifera Pocock, 1898 – Solomon Is.
Gasteracantha s. bistrigella Strand, 1911 – Papua New Guinea (Bismarck Arch.)
Gasteracantha s. heterospina Strand, 1915 – Papua New Guinea (Bismarck Arch.)
Gasteracantha s. pustulinota Strand, 1911 – Papua New Guinea (Bismarck Arch.)
G. simoni O. Pickard-Cambridge, 1879 – Central Africa
G. sororna Butler, 1873 – India
G. sturi (Doleschall, 1857) – Laos, Sumatra, Java, Borneo, Moluccas
G. subaequispina Dahl, 1914 – Borneo, New Guinea
G. taeniata (Walckenaer, 1841) – India to Polynesia
Gasteracantha t. analispina Strand, 1911 – New Guinea
Gasteracantha t. anirensis Strand, 1911 – Papua New Guinea (New Ireland)
Gasteracantha t. lugubris Simon, 1898 – Solomon Is.
Gasteracantha t. novahannoveriana Dahl, 1914 – Papua New Guinea (Bismarck Arch.)
G. theisi Guérin, 1838 – Indonesia, New Guinea
G. thomasinsulae Archer, 1951 – São Tomé and Príncipe
G. thorelli Keyserling, 1864 – Madagascar
G. tondanae Pocock, 1897 – Indonesia (Sulawesi)
G. transversa C. L. Koch, 1837 – Indonesia (Sumatra, Java)
G. unguifera Simon, 1889 – China, India
G. versicolor (Walckenaer, 1841) – Central, East, Southern Africa
Gasteracantha v. avaratrae Emerit, 1974 – Madagascar
Gasteracantha v. formosa Vinson, 1863 – Madagascar
G. westringi Keyserling, 1864 – Australia, Admiralty Is., New Caledonia

Gallery

References

External links

 Video of a spiny orbweaver's heart beating

Araneidae
Araneomorphae genera
Cosmopolitan spiders
Taxa named by Carl Jakob Sundevall